Hermann Bitz (born 21 September 1950 in Olsbrücken) is a retired German football player. He spent eight seasons in the Bundesliga with 1. FC Kaiserslautern, Kickers Offenbach and TSV 1860 München. He also participated in the 1972 Olympics for West Germany.

Honours
 DFB-Pokal finalist: 1971–72

References

External links
 

1950 births
Living people
German footballers
Germany under-21 international footballers
1. FC Kaiserslautern players
Kickers Offenbach players
TSV 1860 Munich players
Bundesliga players
2. Bundesliga players
Footballers at the 1972 Summer Olympics
Olympic footballers of West Germany
West German footballers
Association football midfielders